Lerrel Keith Sharp (6 June 1933 – 15 December 2020) was an Australian rules footballer, who played for Scottsdale and North Launceston in the Northern Tasmanian Football Association (NTFL) and Collingwood in the Victorian Football League (VFL).

He began his senior career with Scottsdale in the Northern Tasmanian Football Association. After a number of years at Collingwood Sharp returned to Tasmania and played with North Launceston in the NTFA. He is an inductee in the AFL Tasmania Hall of Fame.

References

External links
 
 

1933 births
2020 deaths
Australian rules footballers from Tasmania
Scottsdale Football Club players
Collingwood Football Club players
Collingwood Football Club Premiership players
North Launceston Football Club players
Tasmanian Football Hall of Fame inductees
One-time VFL/AFL Premiership players